The  is the Japanese-language edition of Wikipedia, a free, open-source online encyclopedia. Started on 11 May 2001, the edition attained the 200,000 article mark in April 2006 and the 500,000 article mark in June 2008.

As of June 2020, it is the world's most visited language Wikipedia after the English Wikipedia.

History
In March 2001, three non-English editions of Wikipedia were created, namely, the German, Catalan and Japanese Wikipedias.  The original site address of the Japanese Wikipedia was http://nihongo.wikipedia.com and all pages were written in the Latin alphabet or romaji, as the software did not work with Japanese characters at the time. The home page also showed an early attempt at creating a vertical text.

The first article was named "Nihongo no Funimekusu" (meaning "Phonemics of the Japanese language"). Until late December in that year, there were only two articles.

Awards
In September 2004, the Japanese Wikipedia was awarded the "2004 Web Creation Award Web-Person Special Prize" from the Japan Advertisers Association. This award, normally given to individuals for great contributions to the Web in Japanese, was accepted by a long-standing contributor on behalf of the project.

Characteristics

The Japanese Wikipedia is different from the English Wikipedia in a number of ways.

Editing
An edit is kept only if it is legal under both Japanese and United States laws, to account for the fact that the vast majority of contributors live in Japan. This has two major consequences:
The fair use provisions of US law are not considered to be applicable. Articles and media files which do not have a GFDL-compatible license are prohibited, even if they would be legal under the "fair use" doctrine in the US.
Materials considered illegal cannot be kept in the archive, even reverted by oneself but caught in history archive. If an illegal edit is inserted between valid versions, an admin may make specific revisions inaccessible from the history.
Quotation is discouraged. There is controversy over the GFDL compatibility of quotations. Articles that contain quotations will be deleted unless they meet all the following legal requirements:
The source is clearly referred to.
The quotation is necessary.
The quoting and quoted works can respectively be regarded as the principal and subordinate both in quantity and quality.
The quoting and quoted works are clearly distinguishable.
Cut-and-paste moves within Wikipedias, including merging, splitting, and translation from another language are not allowed unless the original article source and date is explicitly referred to in the edit summary, because such moves are considered to be GFDL violations. Articles created in such a manner will be deleted. A comparable policy is in place on the English Wikipedia, but it is only casually enforced.

Wikipedians in Japanese Wikipedia generally do not create independent lists of volumes of manga, or episodes of anime, however there are exceptions, e.g. :ja:Q.E.D. 証明終了のエピソード一覧 and :ja:ONE PIECE (アニメ) のエピソード一覧. Articles about manga works usually do not contain lists of chapters. Also lists of episodes of anime embedded in related articles and independent lists of episodes of anime do not contain plot synopsis.

Community
IP users' contributions are high compared to other major language versions of Wikipedia (see graph).
The Japanese Wikipedia has the lowest number of administrators per active users (only %).
Edit wars are strongly frowned upon.  Articles may be protected as a result of an edit war with as little as three or four edits. Protected pages will not be unprotected unless someone explicitly requests it.  Perhaps because of this,  the Japanese Wikipedia had the second-highest number of articles protected for over two weeks, after the German Wikipedia. In May 2008, 0.0906% of articles were fully protected (only editable by admins), which was by far the highest percentage among the ten largest Wikipedias. Articles on sensitive topics, such as Japanese war crimes and current territorial disputes, are almost always under lengthy protection.
On April 18, 2010, there was a proposal to create a new namespace specifically for WikiProjects to shorten the name of a WikiProject. This proposal finally passed and a new namespace named "プロジェクト:" (Project:) was created for WikiProjects on September 20 the same year (UTC).
The edition stresses the fact that it is not a news bulletin, and discourages edits on current events.
In keeping with the strong aversion to edit wars, the administrators react negatively to cases where many minor edits are made to a single article in a short period of time.
The Japanese Wikipedia is Japan-centered, due to the fact that the overwhelming majority of users are Japanese people, nearly all living in Japan. When referring to places outside Japan they are often called "overseas", and references to Japanese perspective on articles are common. They are trying to discourage this tendency.

Policies
Articles will be deleted if they contain the names of private citizens, unless they are public figures (under section B-2 of Japanese deletion policy). For example, an article about Shosei Koda, a Japanese citizen kidnapped in Iraq, does not refer to him by name, but former Prime Minister Yasuo Fukuda's name may be mentioned due to his public position. Convicted criminals and their victims are considered private citizens, even if the case was extensively covered in Japanese media, and their names may not be published until their death.
The Japanese edition of the English policy Ignore All Rules (directly linked to one of Five Pillars) is neither a policy nor a guideline.
The Japanese edition of the English Wikipedia how-to guide How to write a plot summary is a formal guideline.
The Japanese edition of the English Wikipedia page Handling trivia (which is an explanatory supplement to the Manual of Style guideline on trivia sections) is a formal guideline as well.
The Japanese edition of the English banning policy is not a policy, for lack of the Arbitration Committee.
Toukou Burokku Irai (Blocking requests), which has no corresponding rules in English Wikipedia, is frequently used. And often well-known users who have been active for a long time are blocked indefinitely. The blocked user may appeal for lifting the block, as in the case of blocking in English Wikipedia.
There is no local chapter of the Wikimedia Foundation in Japan.

Culture 
Andrew Lih has written that influence from 2channel (2ch) resulted in many Japanese Wikipedia editors being unregistered and anonymous. Because of the lack of registered users, Japanese Wikipedia editors as a whole interact less with the international Wikipedia community and the Wikimedia Foundation than editors of other Wikipedias do. Lih also wrote that Japanese Wikipedia users are less likely to engage in edit wars than users on Wikipedias of Western languages, and typically they would instead make alternative drafts of articles on their own userspaces.

Jimmy Wales has pointed out at a conference that the Japanese Wikipedia is significantly more dominated by articles about pop culture than other Wikipedia projects, and according to one of his slides, "barely 20 percent" of the articles on the Japanese Wikipedia were about anything else. The Japanese Wikipedia is known to have relatively few moderators as of early March 2010.

Nobuo Ikeda, a known public policy academic and media critic in Japan, has suggested an ongoing 2channel-ization phenomenon on the Japanese Wikipedia. Ikeda argues that by allowing anonymous IP users, the community spawns a type of culture seen in anonymous message boards such as 2channel, where hate speech, personal attacks and derogatory expressions are common, and also the source of entertainment. He also remarks on the "emotional-outlet"/"get rid of stress" aspect of Japanese internet culture where 90% of blogs are anonymous, a complete opposite of the U.S. where 80% of blogs are expressed under one's real name. Ikeda's arguments are not the only sources hinting cultural correlation, influence, overlapping users from 2channel.

In 2006 , a Japanese Wikipedian, stated that on the Japanese Wikipedia most users start out as page editors and uploaders of images, and that the majority of people continue to serve in those roles. Some people apply to become administrators. Kizu said "Unfortunately, some apply for this role out of a desire for power! And then are surprised when they get rejected. (This is a kind of ‘regressive career path’—from an immature editor to a banned one!)"

There are threads of textboards named "【百科事典】ウィキペディア第dddd刷【Wikipedia】" (lit. "[Encyclopedia] Wikipedia Part dddd edition [Wikipedia]") related to the Japanese Wikipedia on 2channel. In these textboards, the Japanese Wikipedia community informally discuss with each other anonymously. On Twitter, they use accounts associated with their username and "#jawp" for mentioning to Japanese Wikipedia.

Criticism 
Attention was drawn to the Japanese Wikipedia article on Kozo Iizuka (:ja:飯塚幸三), which describes his accomplishments in detail but makes no mention of how he killed a woman and her young daughter in the Higashi-Ikebukuro runaway car accident that made him a household name in Japan. An administrator applied protection to the article and later explained that the Japanese Wikipedia community takes legal risks arising from potential privacy violations very seriously, as there is no local chapter of the Wikimedia Foundation to support them in court.

In 2021, an article in the magazine Slate written by Yumiko Sato found that the Japanese Wikipedia had engaged in historical revisionism and whitewashing in a number of articles, most notably the Japanese Wikipedia article on the Battle of Hong Kong (:ja:香港の戦い), the Japanese Wikipedia article on comfort women (:ja:日本の慰安婦), the Japanese Wikipedia article on the Nanjing Massacre (:ja:南京事件), and the Japanese Wikipedia article on Unit 731 (:ja:731部隊). A Japanese Wikipedia editor and Shakespeare specialist, responded to Sato's criticism, arguing that her criticism was based in part on her lack of understanding of Wikipedia policy, as well as confusion over Wikipedia jargon such as han hogo (semi-protection) and zen hogo (full protection).

On July 19, 2021, Keigo Oyamada as Cornelius, the composer of the 2020 Tokyo Olympic games opening ceremony, resigned after it emerged that he had bullied classmates with disabilities when he was a student. Flash, a Japanese weekly magazine, criticized the Japanese Wikipedia for repeatedly removing over multiple years the addition of information about Oyamada and his history of bullying, despite this information having already been reported on in reliable sources in the 1990s in another magazine's interview report. Flash argued, "If Wikipedia had mentioned the facts of Oyamada's bullying, he may not have been appointed from the beginning."

References 
 Lih, Andrew. The Wikipedia Revolution: How a Bunch of Nobodies Created the World's Greatest Encyclopedia. Hyperion, New York City. 2009. First Edition.  (alkaline paper).

Notes

External links 

  Japanese Wikipedia
  Japanese Wikipedia mobile version
 A guide to the Japanese Wikipedia

Wikipedias by language
Internet properties established in 2001
Japanese-language websites
Japanese encyclopedias
2001 establishments in Japan